Við Løkin is a stadium in Runavík, Faroe Islands. It is currently used mostly for football matches and is the home ground of NSÍ Runavík. The stadium holds 1,500 people.

References

External links
Við Løkin at NordicStadiums

Football venues in the Faroe Islands
NSÍ Runavík